Lynda Moss is a Democratic former member of the Montana Senate.  She represented District 26 from 2004 to 2012. She was a Majority Whip in the 2008-2010 session.  She was ineligible to run for election in 2012 due to Montana's term limits.

In 2012 she ran for Montana Public Service Commissioner but did not advance in the primaries.

In November 2017, Moss announced her candidacy for the U.S. House representing Montana's at-large congressional district in the 2018 U.S. federal election. She dropped out of the race in April 2018, after the deadline to have her name removed from the ballot. She ended the primary in 4th place with 5,592 votes.

References

External links
Lynda Moss for Congress - campaign website
Montana State Senate - Lynda Moss official government website
Project Vote Smart - Senator Lynda Moss (MT) profile
Follow the Money - Lynda Moss
2008 2006 2004 Senate campaign contributions

Senator Moss was featured on MTBusiness.com, sharing some of her insights on wind energy and its potential to shape Montana's natural resource futures. You can read the article at: http://mtbusiness.com/index.php?option=com_content&task=view&id=1218&Itemid=1

Democratic Party Montana state senators
1950 births
Living people
Women state legislators in Montana
People from Torrington, Wyoming
University of Nebraska alumni
University of Northern Iowa alumni
Montana State University alumni
Politicians from Billings, Montana
21st-century American women